Seaton Junction is a closed railway station on the West of England Main Line from London Waterloo to Exeter. It was situated 3 miles west of Axminster and 7 miles east of Honiton. It was previously known as Colyton for Seaton and Colyton Junction.

History 

Originally named "Colyton for Seaton" the station opened on 19 July 1860 on completion of the Exeter Extension of the London and South Western Railway from Yeovil Junction to Exeter Queen Street.

With the opening of the Seaton & Beer Railway on 16 March 1868 the name was changed to "Colyton Junction", before finally becoming "Seaton Junction" on 18 July 1869.

Originally trains arriving from the Seaton branch had to reverse into "down" (westbound) platform, however the station was reconstructed in 1927–8 with two through tracks on the main line and loops to the newly extended platforms. At the same time a new branch line platform was added, set at an angle of 45° to the main line.

The location of the station created a major problem for westbound trains stopping at Seaton Junction since it was situated at the start of a six miles climb at 1 in 80 to the summit of the line at Honiton tunnel.

The steady decline in holiday traffic resulting from increased car ownership in the 1960s led to a gradual run down of services and the branch line and junction station closed on 7 March 1966 by the Western Region of British Railways.

Stationmasters

George Evans 1868 - 1879 (afterwards station master at Chard)
G. Smith ca. 1881
James Lock 1882 - 1888 (afterwards station master at Torrington)
Mr. Geoghan 1888 - ca. 1895 (formerly station master at Lapford)
John Hobbs 1898 - 1904  (formerly station master at Camelford, afterwards station master at Sidmouth Junction)
William J. Brown 1904 - 1909 (formerly station master at Whimple, afterwards station master at Chard)
William Thomas Smith 1909 - 1912 (formerly station master at Bridstowe)
Arthur J. Hatyer 1912 - 1926 (afterwards station master at Axminster)
W.A. Palmer 1926
H.R. Evans 1926 - 1933 (afterwards station master at Hither Green)
A.G. Carter 1933 - 1939 (afterwards station master at Petersfield)
W.H.W. Beer 1939 - 1945

Present day 

The station building is now a private residence. The platform is still visible (albeit overgrown). The footbridge from the island platform still survives today.
Trains still pass the site on the West of England Main Line.

See also 
 Seaton Tramway

References

 The Salisbury to Exeter Line by Derek Phillips and George Pryer. Oxford Publishing Company. 1997. 

Disused railway stations in Devon
Railway stations in Great Britain opened in 1860
Railway stations in Great Britain closed in 1966
Former London and South Western Railway stations
Beeching closures in England